Lemnos International Airport "Hephaestus"  is an airport on Lemnos Island, Greece. The airport is located 18 km away from the city of Myrina and began operation in 1959.  This Airport, along with the whole island of Lemnos, was also featured in the video game Arma 3. The island was named "Altis" in the video game.

Airlines and destinations
The following airlines operate regular scheduled and charter flights at Lemnos Airport:

Statistics

See also
Transport in Greece

References

Airports in Greece
Lemnos
Buildings and structures in the North Aegean